Gary Russell (born 1963) is a British writer and former child actor.

Gary Russell may also refer to:

Gary Russell Jr. (born 1988), American professional boxer
Gary Allen Russell (born 1993), American amateur boxer, brother of Gary Russell, Jr.
Gary Antuanne Russell (born 1996), American amateur boxer, brother of Gary Russell, Jr. and Gary Allen Russell
Gary Russell (American football) (born 1986), American football running back

See also
Russell Gary (1959–2019), American football defensive back